County of Young is a cadastral unit located in the Australian state of South Australia covers land located in the state’s east on the north side of the Murray River.  It was proclaimed in 1860 by Governor MacDonnell and named after his predecessor, Governor Young.  It has been partially divided in the following sub-units of hundreds –   Markaranka,   Parcoola,   Pooginook and  Stuart.

Description 
The County of Young covers part of South Australia to the north of the Murray River.

History
The County of Young was proclaimed by Richard Graves MacDonnell, the sixth Governor of South Australia on 19 April 1860.  The county was named after Henry Edward Fox Young who was the fifth Governor of South Australia from 2 August 1848 to 20 December 1854.  The following four hundreds were proclaimed within the County between the years 1860 and 1815 - Markaranka, Parcoola and Pooginook in 1915, and Stuart in 1860.

Constituent hundreds

Location of constituent hundreds
The constituent hundreds are located along the southern boundary of the county in the following order (from west to east) - Stuart, Markaranka, Pooginook and Parcoola.

Hundred of Markaranka  
The Hundred of Markaranka was proclaimed by Governor Galway on 7 October 1915.

Hundred of Parcoola 
The Hundred of Parcoola was proclaimed by Governor Galway on 7 October 1915.

Hundred of Pooginook 
The Hundred of Pooginook was proclaimed by Governor Galway on 7 October 1915.

Hundred of Stuart 
The Hundred of Stuart was proclaimed on 19 April 1860.

See also
Lands administrative divisions of South Australia

References

Young
Young
Young